This is a listing of the horses that finished in either first, second, or third place and the number of starters in the Gallorette Handicap, an American Grade 3 race for fillies and mares age three and up at 1-1/16 miles on the turf held at Pimlico Race Course in Baltimore, Maryland.  (1960-present)

See also 

 List of graded stakes at Pimlico Race Course

References 

Lists of horse racing results
Pimlico Race Course